The 2022–23 season is the 113th season in the history of Real Sociedad and their 13th consecutive season in the top flight. The club are participating in La Liga, the Copa del Rey, and the UEFA Europa League.

Players

First-team squad

Reserve team

Out on loan

Transfers

In

Out

Pre-season and friendlies 

La Real announced that the team would start training on 7 July.

Competitions

Overall record

La Liga

League table

Results summary

Results by round

Matches 
The league fixtures were announced on 23 June 2022.

Copa del Rey

UEFA Europa League

Group stage 

The draw for the group stage was held on 26 August 2022.

Knockout phase

Round of 16 
The draw for the round of 16 was held on 24 February 2023.

Statistics

Squad statistics
Last updated on 18 February 2023.

|-
! colspan="14" style="background:#dcdcdc; text-align:center"|Goalkeepers

|-
! colspan="14" style="background:#dcdcdc; text-align:center"|Defenders

|-
! colspan="14" style="background:#dcdcdc; text-align:center"|Midfielders

|-
! colspan="14" style="background:#dcdcdc; text-align:center"|Forwards

|-
! colspan=14 style=background:#dcdcdc; text-align:center|Players who have made an appearance this season but have left the club

|}

Goalscorers 

Last updated: 12 September 2022

Clean sheets
As of 11 October 2022.

Disciplinary record
Includes all competitive matches. Players listed below made at least one appearance for Real Sociedad first squad during the season.

References 

Real Sociedad seasons
Real Sociedad
2022–23 UEFA Europa League participants seasons